Joseph Coiny (1795, Paris-1829) was a French engraver. He was the son of the engraver Jacques Joseph Coiny. He won the Prix de Rome for engraving in 1816.

References

External references
BNF: Œuvre de Joseph Coiny
Artprice.com: Joseph COINY (1795-1829)

1795 births
1829 deaths
French engravers